Herman Tømmeraas (born 2 April 1997) is a Norwegian actor and dancer known for his recurring character in the TV teen drama series Skam.

Early life 
Tømmeraas was born in Solbergelva, a suburb in the city of Drammen. He grew up with his parents, Bjorn Olav and Runi Tømmeraas, in the town of Drammen. He has a younger brother, Teodor. He attended Killingrud Ungdomsskole, a private arts school. In 2017, Tømmeraas started serving Norway's compulsory military service for a year, finishing at the age of 20.

Career 
Tømmeraas began his acting career at the age of seven in the short film Arkitektene in 2008. When he turned 13, he appeared in Stikk as part of a Norwegian TV production. Tømmeraas also danced with his group, We are 1

He almost gave up on acting as he had no roles till the age of 18, when he landed the role of Christoffer Schistad in the Norwegian teen drama web series Skam. He saw an ad and auditioned for the role of William but ended up with Chris's role, for which he is now best known for worldwide.

In 2017, Tømmeraas also starred and co-produced Semester, the first Scandinavian drama on Snapchat Shows, with Ulrik Imtiaz Rolfsen. He also starred in a music video with Astrid S for the song "Such a Boy". He voiced the character of Walter Beckett in the Norwegian-dubbed version of the American animated series Spies in Disguise (his character was voiced over by Tom Holland in the English version) in 2018. He also voiced the baby in Yngvild Sve Flikke's comedy Ninjababy.

Tømmeraas is currently starring as the giant Fjor in Netflix's Ragnarok.

Personal life
Tømmeraas dated football player Amalie Snolos in 2018.

Filmography

Film

Television

External links

References 

1997 births
Living people
Norwegian television producers
Norwegian male film actors
Norwegian male stage actors
Norwegian male television actors